3 2 1, or 3, 2, 1 or 3-2-1 may refer to:

Outside of music and entertainment
 321, the year 321
 321 (number), the number 321

Entertainment
3-2-1, Yorkshire TV gameshow 1978–1988
3,2,1... Frankie Go Boom, 2012 film directed by Jordan Roberts
3-2-1 Contact, an American science educational television show that aired on PBS 1980–1988
3-2-1 Penguins!, a series of Christian computer-animated (direct-to-video until 2003) cartoons launched on November 14, 2000

Music

Albums
3.2.1., an album by the rock band Zilch, 1998
Three. Two. One., an album by Lennon Stella, 2020
3-2-1, a compilation album by Lior (singer), 2011

Songs
"3 2 1" (Shinee song), a 2013 song by Shinee
"3-2-1" (Brett Kissel song), a song by Brett Kissel from the 2013 album Started with a Song
"321", a song by Scorpions from the 2007 album Humanity: Hour I
"321", a song by Hedley from the 2005 album Hedley
"321", a 2008 single by Disciple from Southern Hospitality
"3, 2, 1", a song by 24kGoldn from the 2021 album El Dorado

See also
4, 3, 2, 1, various topics
5-4-3-2-1, a 1963 single by Manfred Mann
Countdown, a sequence of backward counting to indicate the time remaining before an event is scheduled to occur